Joseph Ranger may refer to:

 Joseph Ranger (seaman), a Black Virginian sailor in the American Revolutionary War
 Joseph Ranger, one of the Parti crédit social uni candidates in the 1985 Quebec provincial election